Kurixalus verrucosus (Boulenger's bushfrog, small rough-armed tree frog) is a species of frog in the family Rhacophoridae found in Myanmar, Thailand, China, and Vietnam. In the past, it has been considered synonym of Rhacophorus appendiculatus (=Kurixalus appendiculatus), which, together with other confusion regarding the identity of this species, makes interpreting older literature difficult. Its natural habitats are subtropical or tropical moist lowland forests, subtropical or tropical moist montane forests, rivers, and intermittent rivers. It is threatened by habitat loss.

References

verrucosus
Amphibians of Myanmar
Amphibians of China
Amphibians of Thailand
Amphibians of Vietnam
Taxonomy articles created by Polbot
Amphibians described in 1893